Drishyam is an Indian crime thriller film series, written and directed by Jeethu Joseph, produced by Antony Perumbavoor under Aashirvad Cinemas. It stars Mohanlal, Meena, Ansiba Hassan and Esther Anil in the lead roles. The film series follows the struggle of Georgekutty and his family who come under suspicion when Varun Prabhakar, the son of Inspector-general of police, goes missing.

The first installment to the film series was released on 19 December 2013 and was received very well at the box office. The film was an Industry hit and was the highest-grossing Malayalam film at that time.

Jeethu didn't thought of a sequel to the movie until the producer giving him the idea of it. Later, he started to write the screenplay to the sequel of the film. The film was shot completely in the Covid-19 pandemic and was released through Amazon Prime Video on 19 February 2021. The sequel was well received and appreciated by the critics and audience, claiming it 'One of the best ever sequels in Indian cinema'.

Development

Drishyam
In July 2013, it was reported that Jeethu Joseph will be directing a film titled My Family with Mohanlal in the lead. In August 2013, Jeethu clarified that the film was titled Drishyam. A thread similar to that of Drishyam has been with the director since the early 1990s. He was inspired by a conversation he had overheard about the plight of two families involved in a legal battle. Jeethu had penned the story of Drishyam even before Memories (2013). He says, "I started working on the subject some two years back. But I wanted to stick to the planned order and hence postponed the project till I finished Memories". The script was initially planned to be filmed by another director but since that director could not find a producer, Jeethu took back the script and decided to direct it himself. Drishyam contrasts from the director's previous films. He says, "Different films require different treatment. I toiled hard while filming Memories as the film was full of twists and turns and the handling of the subject mattered a lot. But Drishyam is a complete script-oriented film that does not require any special effort. We shot the film sticking completely to the script, and the shooting was completed effortlessly."

Drishyam 2

Jeethu Joseph and Mohanlal were filming for Ram prior to the COVID-19 lockdown in India, however the shooting of the film was stalled as some sequences they want to film in foreign locations, such as London and Cairo. As the crew realised that the filming would take time to continue, Jeethu decided to start the works for Drishyam 2, a sequel to their 2013 film Drishyam which he had plans for some time. As the shooting of the film would only take place in Kerala, Jeethu realised it was most appropriate film to shoot after the lockdown ends. The film was officially announced by Mohanlal on his 60th birthday on 21 May 2020. It was intended to start filming soon after the government allows permission to begin film shootings. Mohanlal said during an interview that he has read the script, and shooting might begin after lockdown. Antony Perumbavoor who produced Drishyam returns as the producer. Jeethu said that it is a direct continuation of the last film and for that he has retained the principal characters along with some new additions in the secondary cast. In the turn of events, Georgekutty and his family now leads an affluent life and Georgekutty has opened a cinema theatre and is also planning to produce a film.

Cast and Crew

Cast

Drishyam

 Mohanlal as Georgekutty, a local cable TV operator
 Meena as Rani George, Georgekutty's wife
 Ansiba Hassan as Anju George, George's elder daughter
 Esther Anil as Anumol George (Anu), George's younger daughter
 Asha Sharath as Geetha Prabhakar, Inspector General of Police
 Siddique as Prabhakar, Geetha's husband
 Kalabhavan Shajon as Constable Sahadevan Ramkant
 Neeraj Madhav as Monichan, George's aide
 Irshad as SI Suresh Babu
 Roshan Basheer as Varun Prabhakar, Geetha & Prabhakar's son
 Aneesh G. Menon as Rajesh, Rani's brother
 Kunchan as Head constable S. Madhavan
 Kozhikode Narayanan Nair as Sulaiman, Owner of the Tea Shop
 Baiju V. K. as Soman
 P. Sreekumar as Rani's father
 Shobha Mohan as Rani's mother
 Koottickal Jayachandran as Murali
 Kalabhavan Rahman as Bus Conductor
 Kalabhavan Haneef as Theatre Operator
 Balaji Sharma as Restaurant Owner
 Pradeep Chandran as the new Sub-Inspector
 Antony Perumbavoor as Antony, a police officer
 Mela Raghu as Raghu, Waiter at the Tea Shop
 Arun S. Panackal as Alex, Varun's friend at Nature Camp
 Nisha Sarang as School Principal
Jeethu Joseph as Contractor of Police Station building

Drishyam 2

Crew

Remakes

Drishyam
Drishyam was remade into several languages. The Indian remake rights of the film were sold for 155 million. All the versions were commercially successful. The film was remade in Kannada as Drishya (2014),  in Telugu as Drushyam (2014), in Tamil as Papanasam (2015) by Joseph himself, in Hindi as Drishyam (2015), in Sinhala as Dharmayuddhaya (2017) and in Mandarin Chinese as Sheep Without a Shepherd (2019) with a different ending.

Drishyam 2
The film was remade in Kannada as Drishya 2 directed by P. Vasu and in Telugu as Drushyam 2 (2021) by Jeethu Joseph himself. The Hindi remake titled Drishyam 2 directed by Abhishek Pathak was released on theatres on 18 November 2022. Jeethu had plans to direct a Tamil remake.

Notes

See also
Cop Universe
Dhoom (franchise)
Tiger (franchise)
Race (film series)
Baaghi (film series)
Dinesh Vijan's horror-comedy universe
 K.G.F (film series)
 YRF Spy Universe
 Lokesh Cinematic Universe

References

External links
 
 

2010s Malayalam-language films
2013 thriller drama films
2013 films
Fictional portrayals of the Kerala Police
Films directed by Jeethu Joseph
Films involved in plagiarism controversies
Indian crime thriller films
Indian thriller drama films
2013 crime thriller films
Malayalam films remade in other languages
2013 drama films
Aashirvad Cinemas films
Malayalam films in series
2020s Malayalam-language films
2021 crime drama films
Amazon Prime Video original films